Field of Honor (2014) was the inaugural Field of Honor professional wrestling event produced by Ring of Honor (ROH), that took place on August 15, 2014 at the MCU Park in Brooklyn, New York. Field of Honor '14 is on ROH Wrestling.com's Home Page in the Video on Demand Section.

Storylines
Field of Honor featured professional wrestling matches, involving different wrestlers from pre-existing scripted feuds, plots, and storylines that played out on ROH's television programs. Wrestlers portrayed villains or heroes as they followed a series of events that built tension and culminated in a wrestling match or series of matches.

Results

See also
ROH's annual events
2014 in professional wrestling

References

External links
 Ring of Honor's official site

2014 in professional wrestling
Events in Brooklyn, New York
2014 in New York City
Professional wrestling in New York City
August 2014 events in the United States
ROH Field of Honor